Allan's Wife and Other Tales is a collection of Allan Quatermain stories by H. Rider Haggard, first published in London by Spencer Blackett in December 1889. The title story was new, with its first publication intended for the collection, but two unauthorized editions appeared earlier in New York, based on pirated galley proofs. The other three stories first appeared in an anthology and periodicals in 1885, 1887, and 1886.

The significance of the collection was recognized by its republication (as Allan's Wife, With Hunter Quartermain's Story, a Tale of Three Lions, and Long Odds) by the Newcastle Publishing Company as the twenty-fourth volume of the celebrated Newcastle Forgotten Fantasy Library series in October, 1980.

Contents 
Allan's Wife - the story of Quartermain's early life, and his marriage to Stella, mother of his son Harry.
Hunter Quatermain's Story
A Tale of Three Lions
Long Odds

References

External links

 
 
 
 
Images and bibliographic information for various editions of Allan's Wife and Other Tales at SouthAfricaBooks.com

British short story collections
1889 short story collections
Fantasy short story collections
Works by H. Rider Haggard